This is a list of Members of Parliament (MPs) elected to the 2nd parliament in the reign of King James I in 1614, known as the Addled Parliament.

The parliament began on 5 April 1614 and was held to 7 June 1614.  It was nicknamed the "Addled Parliament" because of its ineffectiveness. The parliament lasted no more than eight weeks and failed to resolve the conflict between the king, who wished to raise money in the form of a 'Benevolence', a grant of £65,000 and the House of Commons (who were resisting further taxation). It was dissolved by the king.

Prior to 1621 there was no official list of members and the 1614 parliamentary list is incomplete. About 100 MPs are unidentified and 130 are conjectural according to Browne Willis, and these are marked in italics.

In 1985 a more credible list was produced by Maija Jansson as a doctoral thesis.

List of constituencies and members

See also
List of parliaments of England
Addled Parliament

Notes

References
D. Brunton & D. H. Pennington, Members of the Long Parliament (London: George Allen & Unwin, 1954)
Cobbett's Parliamentary history of England, from the Norman Conquest in 1066 to the year 1803 (London: Thomas Hansard, 1808)

Parliaments of James I of England
1614 in England
1614 in politics
1614